Mandohol Dam, is an earth-fill dam on Mandohol River in Karjule Hareshwar village of Parner taluka in Ahmednagar district of state of Maharashtra in India.

Construction
The dam is constructed by Command Area Development Authority (CADA), Ahmednagar. It was constructed between 1977 and 1983, and was opened for irrigation purpose in 1984.

Specifications

Purpose
 Irrigation
 Drinking water for neatest villages

See also
 Dams in Maharashtra

References

Dams in Ahmednagar district
Dams completed in 1984
Earth-filled dams
1984 establishments in Maharashtra